Garrett Mitchell may refer to:

Garrett Mitchell (baseball) (born 1998), American baseball outfielder
Garrett Mitchell (ice hockey) (born 1991), Canadian ice hockey player
Garrett Mitchell (born 1995), American YouTube personality who uses the persona Cleetus McFarland